The Mikoyan MiG-35 (NATO reporting name: Fulcrum-F) is a Russian multirole fighter that is designed by Mikoyan, a division of the United Aircraft Corporation (UAC). Marketed as a 4++ generation jet fighter, it is a further development of the MiG-29M/M2 and MiG-29K/KUB fighters. According to a Russian defense industry source, the Mikoyan MiG-35 is essentially an upgraded variant of the MiG-29KR. Many consider MiG-35 a new name given by Mikoyan for marketing. The first prototype was a modification of the aircraft that previously served as a MiG-29M2 model demonstrator given temporary name MiG-35 but a later prototype was a different model with different equipment that served as the base for the MiG-35 as is known today. Mikoyan first officially presented the MiG-35 internationally during the 2017 Moscow air show; the first two serial production aircraft entered service in 2019.

The single-seat version is designated MiG-35S and the two-seat version MiG-35UB. The fighter has vastly improved avionics and weapon systems compared to early variants of MiG-29, notably new precision-guided targeting capability and the uniquely designed optical locator system, which relieves the aircraft from relying on ground-controlled interception systems and enables it to conduct independent multirole missions. Serial production aircraft use a PESA radar and there is also an option available for AESA radar. The serial production aircraft does not have thrust vectoring control as previously planned.

History

Previous Iteration
There were references in the late 1980s to a very different design also identified as "MiG-35". This design was a single-engined combat aircraft for air-to-air and secondary air-to-ground roles. According to unidentified Indian sources, the aircraft was evaluated by Indian pilots in the Soviet Union and was probably suggested as an alternative for the Indian LCA being developed at that time.

MiG-29/35 for MRCA

Russia unveiled model of MiG-29M that was given temporary name for marketing and export purposes the MiG-35 at the 2007 Aero India air show in Bangalore, amid Moscow's desire to sell these planes to India. The MiG-35 was a contender with the Eurofighter Typhoon, Boeing F/A-18E/F Super Hornet, Dassault Rafale, Saab JAS 39 Gripen, and General Dynamics F-16 Fighting Falcon in the Indian MRCA competition for 126 multirole combat aircraft to be procured by the Indian Air Force. Deficiencies with the MiG-35's radar and its RD-33MK engines led to the fighter being ousted from the contest in April 2011.

In May 2013, it was reported that Russia intended to order 37 aircraft. In August 2013, the Russian Defense Ministry stated that the purchase worth RUB37 billion ($1.1 billion) would be delayed until 2016 due to the spending cuts in the state arms program for 2014–2016.

In August 2015, Colonel General Viktor Bondarev, commander of Russia's Air and Space Forces stated that MiG-35 development was to be completed in 2017; entry into service is to follow in 2018. The state tests of the MiG-35 were to begin in 2017 with completion in mid-2018 after the serial production of the aircraft would have started. According to Viktor Bondarev, Russian Aerospace Forces plan to replace their whole fleet of light fighters with MiG-35s and thus there is a need for at least 170 of such aircraft.

During 2016, the first two pre-production aircraft were being built at the Production Center No.1 in Lukhovitsy. Both aircraft were delivered at the end of the year.

New MiG-35 
On 26 January 2017, Mikoyan demonstrated the new MiG-35 to Russian Government, in a widely publicized event with subsequent demonstration for export customers was carried out the next day. Significant upgrades on the MiG-35 include a completely new fly-by-wire flight control system, vastly improved cockpit, substantially upgraded avionics and integrated precision-guided targeting capability for air-to-ground weapons. MiG-35 is fitted with a Russian non-removable NPK-SPP OLS-K electro-optical targeting and surveillance system pod, mounted directly to the aircraft below the right (starboard) fuselage on the engine nacelle in front of the elevators. This marked an overall design philosophy that provides an enhanced degree of operational autonomy on the MiG-35 compared to earlier Russian combat aircraft.

In July 2017, during the MAKS 2017 International Aviation and Space Salon, the Russian Defence Ministry agreed it will buy 24 MiG-35s as a part of the new state armament program for 2018–2027. Six out of the 24 MiG-35s will replace the aging MiG-29s of the Russian Swifts aerobatic team. On 22 August 2018, during the International Military-Technical Forum «ARMY-2018», the first contract for six MiG-35s was signed. The Russian Aerospace Forces plans to sign a second contract for delivery of 14 MiG-35s in 2020.

On 17 June 2019, Russian Aerospace Forces received the first two serially produced MiG-35s, marking the introduction of the variant into service.

On MAKS 2019, Mikoyan unveiled a full scaled mockup of MiG-35 with revised tailfin aimed for export market. According to Tarasenko, the new version features further-refined geometry of the airframe, uprated Klimov RD-33MK engines with thrust at full afterburner of nine tonnes, an advanced electro-optical reconnaissance system, and an active-array (AESA) radar capable of tracking up to 30 targets simultaneously. Additionally, RAC MiG’s press release also mentions “renewed mission equipment” and “other improvements made to meet the requirements of potential foreign customers." The mockup also featured a new head-up display with extra-wide field of view, part of a new mission equipment suite from Ramenskoye PKB.

Initial flight testing
By April 2010, pictures and additional information surfaced of two new MiG-35 demonstrators, the single-seat MiG-35 "961" and the two-seat MiG-35D "967". According to Russian media, they first flew in autumn of 2009, and subsequently took part in MMRCA trials in India in October 2009. Both have a very high commonality with the previous MiG-29K/KUB airframes, an immediate visible difference being the braking parachute installed in place of the hook, present on the naval aircraft. Subsequently, the MiG-35D "967" appears to have been equipped with a similar AESA radar as fitted to the older MiG-35 demonstrator "154", identifiable by the dark grey short nose radome.

On 6 September 2016, according to the general designer of the United Aircraft Corporation Sergei Korotkov, first MiG-35s were to be delivered in November 2016 to the Russian Air Force for flight testing to confirm the technical characteristics of the aircraft. First of the two aircraft, single-seat MiG-35 "702" made its first flight on 24 November 2016, followed by double-seater MiG-35UB "712" in December 2016.

On 26 January 2017, MiG officially demonstrated one of the two pre-production aircraft, MiG-35UB "712", to the Russian government, followed by subsequent demonstration for export customers on the next day. The newly presented MiG-35 appeared to be a bit different than the one unveiled in 2007: the aircraft was allegedly equipped with neither AESA radar nor with thrust vectoring control, supposedly to keep procurement cost low so as not to deter foreign customers.

In July 2017, the director general of the MiG, Ilya Tarasenko, told the press: "We are now testing, and after the results will begin mass production. Serial production will begin within the next two years."

In February 2017, it was announced contract was signed to built another two pre-production aircraft that will join the testing. It was also expected state trials will begin at Chkalov State Flight Test Centre in Akhtubinsk the same year.

In February 2018, MiG Aircraft Corporation announced that it had completed factory trials of the MiG-35, the certificate of the trials completion having been signed in December 2017.

In May 2018, head of the United Aircraft Corporation Yuri Slyusar reported that state trials of the MiG-35 had begun.

In April 2019, MiG-35UB "11" first took off to join the testing. This is first of the two additional pre-production aircraft ordered in February 2017.

In May 2021, MiG-35 has received a preliminary certificate for the limited series production even as it is undergoing state joint trials, Director of the MiG-29M and MiG-35 Aircraft Programs Directorate at the MiG Aircraft Corporation, Musheg Baloyan was quoted as saying by TASS on 5 May 2021.

Design
The MiG-35/MiG-35D incorporate advancements of the MiG-29K/KUB and MiG-29M/M2 fighters in combat efficiency enhancement, universality and operational characteristics improvement. The main features of the new design are the fifth-generation information-sighting systems, compatibility with Russian and foreign weapons applications and an integrated variety of defensive systems to increase combat survivability. The new overall design overtakes the design concepts of the baseline model and enables the new aircraft to conduct full-scale multirole missions as their western counterparts.

New avionics are intended to help the MiG-35 gain air superiority as well as to perform all-weather precision ground strikes, aerial reconnaissance with opto-electronic and radar equipment and to conduct complex joint missions. This includes the RD-33MK engines and the newly designed optical locator system, OLS-35. The number of weapon stations has increased to 9 (similar to MiG-29M2),  flight range has increased by 50%, and radar visibility has been reduced.

The final configuration of the MiG-35's onboard equipment has been left open intentionally using the MIL-STD-1553 bus. Maximum payload is 6.5 tons.

Engines

The MiG-35 is powered by two FADEC RD-33MK Morskaya Osa (literally: "Sea Wasp" or Chironex fleckeri) turbofans. The RD-33MK is a highly improved variant and the latest version of the Klimov RD-33 turbofan and was intended to power the MiG-29K and MiG-29KUB. It has 7% more power compared to the baseline model due to the use of modern materials in the cooled blades, providing a higher thrust of 9,000 kgf. In response to earlier criticism, the new engines are smokeless and include systems that reduce infrared and optical visibility.

According to episode 160 of the Russian military documentary film "Combat Approved", plans for a thrust vectoring variant of MiG-35 were cancelled due to increased weight ratio and the need to reduce costs. A previously planned thrust vectoring MiG-35 variant was planned to include thrust vectoring nozzles that could direct thrust on two different axes. But Rosoboronexport also stated that, "at customer's request, engine may be equipped with a thrust vectoring nozzle".

Armament
In January 2017, during a conference call with Russian President Vladimir Putin, Yuri Slyusar, president of the UAC, reported that the MiG-35 could possibly use a kind of laser weaponry in the future. Military trials of the laser are to proceed immediately after flight testing of the aircraft. However, there was doubt if Slyusar made a mistake by saying laser weaponry instead of laser-guided weapon. The MiG-35 is also planned to be capable of launching the Kh-36 Grom-1 cruise missile, giving it a long-range strike capability that the MiG-29 does not possess.

Cockpit
The MiG-35 has a glass cockpit equipped with night-vision goggles, an additional display for the optical locator system, and a 3-equal-size color LCD multi-function display. The second-seat version of the MiG-35, the MiG-35D, has 4 LCD displays in its rear cockpit. The MiG-35D uses a tandem cockpit while single-seat versions of the MiG-35 uses the rear cockpit to store extra fuel, while retaining a two-seat canopy.

Avionics

Serial production MiG-35s are now equipped with a PESA radar of Zhuk family. Russia also offered Zhuk-A/AM AESA radar for export market. Some sources stated the MiG-35 was to be equipped with the new Phazotron Zhuk-A/AE active electronically scanned array (AESA) radar, the first radar of this kind installed on a Russian fighter aircraft.

For detection of targets in the infrared spectrum, the MiG-35 is equipped with the OLS-UEM (13SM-1) electro-optical targeting station with lookdown capability against ground, sea and air targets. Its forward-looking infrared (FLIR) sensor is capable to detect airborne threats up to 55 km and provides coverage in azimuth of +/- 90-degree and +60-degree to −15-degree in elevation. The OLS-UEM consists of:
 Infra-red search and track sensor
 TV camera with infrared search and track capability
 Multimode laser rangefinder with detection range up to 20 km

There is also the OLS-K/OLS-KE podded electro-optical targeting system mounted under the right engine nacelle. It is designed to search, detect and track ground and sea targets. The system consists of infrared sensor and TV camera and is capable to detect ground targets up to 20 km and sea targets up to 40 km.

To protect the aircraft against current and future surface-to-air (SAM) missiles, the MSP-418KE compact active jammer pod can be mounted on any of the aircraft nine hardpoints.

There has been talk for upgraded ability for MiG-35, including automatic landing, G-force protection systems, voice assistant and smart target identification system based on neural networks, as per customer request

Operational history

Russia
The Russian Defence Ministry intended to place an order for 37 aircraft in 2013, but the number was reduced to 24 in August 2017. The first batch of six MiG-35s was ordered in August 2018, and first two serial aircraft were delivered to the Russian Aerospace Forces on 17 June 2019.

Potential operators

Egypt

In 2014, Egypt planned to sign a large arms deal with Russia for the purchase of 24 MiG-35 fighters. In February 2015, MiG Director General Sergei Korotkov announced that the company was ready to supply the MiG-35 jets to Egypt should the country request them. However, in April 2015, Egypt signed a $2 billion contract for the purchase of 46 MiG-29M/M2 multi-role fighters instead.

India
The MiG-35 was a contender with the Eurofighter Typhoon, Boeing F/A-18E/F Super Hornet, Dassault Rafale, Saab JAS 39 Gripen, and General Dynamics F-16 Fighting Falcon in the Indian MRCA competition for 126 multirole combat aircraft to be procured by the Indian Air Force. During the competition however, India's Ministry of Defence was frustrated with the problems of the aircraft's avionics with the radar not able to achieve the maximum targeting distance during tests. Also, the RD-33MK engines were not shown to reach sufficient thrust. As a result, the MiG-35 was ousted from the contest in April 2011.

The aircraft is now competing with 6 other aircraft in a fresh tender, referred to as MMRCA 2.0 in the Indian media, for the procurement of 114 multi-role combat aircraft. In March 2020, Russia announced that they will offer an upgraded MiG-35 fighter jet equipped with an automatic landing and G-force protection systems as its entry for the Indian light fighter jet competition.

Argentina
In 2021, Russia offered Argentina MiG-35s equipped with Kh-35 anti-ship missile and Kh-38 air-to-surface missiles. On 19 September 2021, Pakistani newspaper Dawn reported that the Argentine government is planning to purchase 12 Chinese - Pakistani joint venture JF-17A Block III fighter jets. In an interview with the website infodefensa.com Air Force chief Xavier Isaac called the Mig-35 one of candidates for the new fighter jet of the Argentine Air Force.

Bangladesh
On 2 March 2017, Bangladesh government floated a closed tender for eight fighters. The tender issued by Directorate General of Defence Purchase (DGDP) was controversial from the beginning as opposition Bangladesh Nationalist Party accused government Awami League of using Indian funding to buy obsolete aircraft from Russia. MiG-35 was one of the contenders, along with Sukhoi Su-30 fighter with European origin AESA radar. The Bangladesh government allocated almost $400 million for the procurement. Russia has negotiated with Bangladesh for a year for the sale of MiG-35. Bangladesh government has terminated the tender due to funding shortage, order placement for Su-30 by Myanmar Air Force in 2018, and lack of interest by Russia's manufacturer to integrate European AESA radar into MIL-STD-1553 bus of the MiG-35 or the Su-30. Italian Elettronica SPA is also unable to work with any Russian company to fulfill Bangladesh's requirements due to international sanctions on Russia.

Malaysia
In 2019, there were reports that the Russian government had proposed providing two squadrons of MiG-35s to the Royal Malaysian Air Force, to replace its MiG-29N fleet. The RMAF had previously mothballed its MiG-29s due to high maintenance costs and downtime. As part of the deal, Malaysia would have returned 18 MiG-29Ns to Russia. This was the essence of an offer made by Russian President Vladimir Putin to Malaysia in August 2019.

In 2021, Russian defence export agency, Rosoboronexport said, Russia will send Mikoyan MiG-35 as the contender of RMAF's LCA program.

Others
Peru and Myanmar were among other countries interested in acquiring MiG-35 fighters.

The MiG-35 is also considered as a potential candidate to replace the retired MiG-21 fleet of the Vietnam People's Air Force.

Variants
MiG-35 Single-seat variant
MiG-35D Two-seat variant
MiG-35S Single-seat serial. The variant has an extra fuel tank in the place of second pilot seat.
MiG-35UB Two-seat serial

Naval version
According to the General Director of Mikoyan, Ilya Tarasenko, a carrier-based version of the MiG-35 is under development. Concern Radio-Electronic Technologies has already adapted a new landing system to the BINS-SP-2 deck for the MiG-35.

Export version
According to the General Director of UAC, Yuri Slyusar, they will create an export version of the MiG-35 fighter with a new cockpit. RAC MiG initially planned to fit in an AESA radar into the MiG-35. However, during series production, MiG has removed the Zhuk-A/AM AESA radar and TVC from the MiG-35 as the AESA is still under development. Export customers has to choose a Zhuk-M with a mechanically steered antenna.

Operators

Russian Aerospace Forces
Russian Air Force

Specifications (MiG-35)

See also

References

Notes

External links

 RAC MiG Corporation page on MiG-35/MiG-35D
United Aircraft Corporation MiG-35 footage
 Klimov page on RD-33MK 'Sea Wasp' engine
 Klimov page on OVT Thrust Vectoring Nozzle used on the MiG-29M OVT variant

MiG-035
2000s Russian fighter aircraft
Twinjets
Aircraft first flown in 2007
Fourth-generation jet fighter
Twin-tail aircraft
4.5-generation jet fighters